Haarlem is a settlement in Garden Route District Municipality in the Western Cape province of South Africa.

Village 16 km east of Avontuur and 29 km south-east of Uniondale, in the Langkloof. Originally laid out in 1856, it was taken over by the Berlin Missionary Society in 1860. The mission station was named Anhalt-Schmidt, but the village had already been named Haarlem and bears that name today, presumably after the city of Haarlem 19 km west of Amsterdam in the Netherlands.

References

Populated places in the George Local Municipality
Populated places established in 1856